Kirk Morris (born 26 August 1942) is an Italian bodybuilder and actor. He was the winner of "Mr.Italia Bodybuilding contest 1961”

Born in Venice as Adriano Bellini, while at university Morris devoted himself to bodybuilding and thanks to his physique he was chosen by the director Tanio Boccia to play the title role in The Triumph of Maciste. He subsequently starred in several other peplum films, including The Witch's Curse by Riccardo Freda. After the decline of the genre, he appeared in several adventure films, then he retired in the early 1970s. He was also an actor of Fotoromanzi.

Filmography
 1971 Sapevano solo uccidere  ... Jeff
 1970 Overrun! ... Liam McGregor
 1969 Sette baschi rossi ... Sergeant
 1967  Rita nel West ... Ringo
 1966  2+5: Missione Hydra ... Belsy
 1965 La magnifica sfida ... Kadir
 1965 Maciste il vendicatore dei Mayas ... Hercules
 1965 Il conquistatore di Atlantide/Conqueror of Atlantis ... Hercules
 1964  La valle dell'eco tonante (aka Hercules of the Desert)  ... Maciste
 1964  Desert Raiders ... Nadir
 1964  Anthar l'invincibile/Devil of the Desert Against the Son of Hercules ... Anthar
 1964  Maciste alla corte dello zar/Atlas Against the Czar ... Maciste
 1964  Terror of the Steppes ... Sandar
 1963  Ercole sfida Sansone/Hercules, Samson and Ulysses ... Hercules
 1963  Sansone contro i pirati ... Samson
 1963  Maciste contro i cacciatori di teste/Colossus and the Headhunters ... Maciste
 1962  Le chevalier de Pardaillan  ... Samson
 1962  Maciste all'inferno/The Witch's Curse ... Maciste
 1961 Maciste contro Ercole nella valle dei guai/Hercules in the Valley of Woe ... Maciste
 1961 Trionfo di Maciste ... Maciste

Notes

External links
 

1942 births
Living people
Italian male film actors
Actors from Venice
Italian bodybuilders
People associated with physical culture